is a Japanese keyboardist and actor. He plays keyboard for Tokio, a Johnny & Associates musical group.

Early life
Taichi Kokubun was born in Higashikurume, Tokyo.

Career

As an artist 
Before debuting with Tokio, Kokubun, like other Tokio members, was a backup-dancer for Johnny's Entertainment boy bands, including Hikaru Genji. In 1990 he became the keyboardist of Tokio, but it was not until 1994 that the band debuted.

In 2004, Kokubun took a break from Tokio to form a temporary group with KinKi Kids member Tsuyoshi Domoto. Together they released the theme song to Fantastipo, a movie in which they starred.

As an actor
Kokubun began his acting career with a role in Abunai Shōnen III, a 1989 Japanese drama. Since 1993, he has played parts in drama shows and movies such as Fantistipo and Shaberedomo Shaberedomo.

He has hosted Gachinko! with other Tokio members. Currently Kokubun hosts Kaitai Shin Show and Shonen Club Premium on NHK, Tetsuwan Dash and Guruguru Ninety-Nine on NTV, R30 and Sekai Kurabete Mitara on TBS, Mentore G on Fuji TV, and Aura no Izumi on TV Asahi.

In April 2009, Kokubun became a sportscaster for the Fuji TV show Sports!.

Filmography

References

External links
 
 Tokio Official Website on Johnnys-Net

1974 births
Living people
People from Higashikurume, Tokyo
Japanese male actors
Japanese keyboardists
Tokio (band) members